Methone was a town and polis (city-state) on the Pagasetic Gulf of Magnesia in ancient Thessaly. The town is mentioned by Homer in the Catalogue of Ships in the Iliad as belonging to Philoctetes. It is also mentioned in the Periplus of Pseudo-Scylax as a city in Magnesia, together with Iolcus, Coracae, Spalauthra and Olizon.

Some accept that the town's location is on a hill called Nevestiki, near the current village of Ano Lechonia, where remains of a fortification have been found, but that location has been suggested by others as the site of Coracae.

References

Ancient Magnesia
Populated places in ancient Thessaly
Locations in the Iliad
Cities in ancient Greece
Former populated places in Greece
Thessalian city-states